Group H of the 2017 Africa Cup of Nations qualification tournament was one of the thirteen groups to decide the teams which qualified for the 2017 Africa Cup of Nations finals tournament. The group consisted of four teams: Ghana, Mozambique, Rwanda, and Mauritius.

The teams played against each other home-and-away in a round-robin format, between June 2015 and September 2016.

Ghana, the group winners, qualified for the 2017 Africa Cup of Nations.

Standings

Matches

Goalscorers
3 goals

 Jordan Ayew
 Ernest Sugira

2 goals

 Christian Atsu
 Asamoah Gyan
 Domingues
 Apson Manjate
 Jacques Tuyisenge

1 goal

 David Accam
 Frank Acheampong
 André Ayew
 John Boye
 Jeffrey Schlupp
 Samuel Tetteh
 Mubarak Wakaso
 Fabien Pithia
 Francis Rasolofonirina
 Andy Sophie
 Bheu António Januário
 Jean-Baptiste Mugiraneza
 Muhadjiri Hakizimana
 Dominique Savio Nshuti
 Fitina Omborenga

Notes

References

External links
Orange Africa Cup Of Nations Qualifiers 2017, CAFonline.com

Group H